"Right Now" is the third single from Psy's 2010 album PsyFive. It was released on October 20, 2010 by YG Entertainment. In September 2011, The single was banned from under-19 audiences by South Korea's Ministry of Gender Equality and Family for what it deemed an "obscene" lyric, "Life is like toxic alcohol". Despite the ban, Psy received awards during the 2011 Melon Music Awards and Mnet Asian Music Awards.

Music video
There are two music videos for this song, the "PSY version" and the "Seo Woo version".

Accolades

Charts

See also
 Gangnam Style
 Gentleman (Psy song)
 Hangover (Psy song)
 YG Entertainment

References

External links
 
 

Psy songs
2010 songs
Korean-language songs
2010 singles
Songs written by Psy